The Lindemannsruhe is an area of upland in the parish of Freinsheim in the German county of Bad Dürkheim. It lies at a height of 465 metres above sea level (NN) in the foothills of the Palatinate Forest, below the Peterskopf (487 m) and was named after a former senior forester, Lindemann. It is a popular recreation area for walkers, hikers and cyclists.

Description 
It is the base for many walkers and hikers as well as a training circuit for numerous mountain bikers and racing cyclists.
On the heights is the Lindemannsruhe forester's lodge, built in 1927, as well as a car park. The woods on the Lindemannsruhe are dominated by sweet chestnut trees, which attract conker collectors every year in the autumn.

The road to the Lindemannshöhe on the western side is only single-lane in places; on the eastern side it is two lanes wide throughout.

In the vicinity of the Lindemannsruhe is the Bismarck monument and Bismarck Tower.

As a result of its location as an exclave the Lindemannsruhe Forester's Lodge is the only building in Freinsheim with both a different post code and dial code: 67098 instead of 67251, and 06322 instead of 06353.

Sport 

 The Palatine Mountain Sprint (Pfälzer Bergsprint) runs via Höningen to the Lindemannsruhe (started 2001)
 The Lindemannsruhe is part of the cycling route of the Maxdorf Triathlon, having to be visited twice from Leistadt.
 Due to paths that have been clearly waymarked by the Palatinate Forest Club the Lindemannsruhe is a starting point for long and short walks e.g. to the  Bismarck Tower or the Ungeheuersee.

Palatinate Forest
Bad Dürkheim (district)